Betty Couper (née Soames) was a British tennis player who appeared at eight Wimbledon Championships. In 1931, she reached the third round of the ladies singles.

References

British female tennis players
Year of birth missing
Year of death missing
Place of birth missing